John Ritchey Kinnear (July 26, 1842 – March 31, 1912) was a politician in the state of Washington. He served in the Washington State Senate from 1889 to 1895.

He died at his home in Seattle on March 31, 1912.

References

Republican Party Washington (state) state senators
People from Tippecanoe County, Indiana
1842 births
1912 deaths
19th-century American politicians